In mathematics, the connectedness theorem may be one of
 Deligne's connectedness theorem
 Fulton–Hansen connectedness theorem
 Grothendieck's connectedness theorem
 Hartshorne's connectedness theorem
 Zariski's connectedness theorem, a generalization of Zariski's main theorem